Moose Mountain was a federal electoral district in Saskatchewan, Canada, that was represented in the House of Commons of Canada from 1948 to 1968.

This riding was created in 1947 from parts of Assiniboia, Qu’Appelle  and Weyburn ridings

The electoral district was abolished in 1966 when it was merged into Qu'Appelle—Moose Mountain riding.

Election results

See also 

 List of Canadian federal electoral districts
 Past Canadian electoral districts

External links 
 

Former federal electoral districts of Saskatchewan